Clarissa Davis (born June 4, 1967) is a former Texas women's basketball All-American, who is also known as Clarissa Davis-Wrightsil. She is a National Player of the Year, Olympic and pro standout, and was inducted into Women's Basketball Hall of Fame in April 2006.  She was one of six inductees in the Class of 2006, which features four former players and two coaches. Born and raised in San Antonio, Texas, Davis played under coach Mike Floyd at John Jay High School before playing at the University of Texas. She also played basketball in Europe with Galatasaray Istanbul and Fenerbahçe Istanbul in Turkey and won Turkish Championships with both of these rival clubs. She won in 1991 EuroLeague Women. Clarissa Davis graduated with a Communications bachelor's degree from the University of Texas in 1989.

Amateur career
 Won the Naismith College Player of the Year award in both 1987 and 1989 and the Wade Trophy in 1989
 As a senior in 1988–89, named Naismith College Player of the Year, USBWA Women's National Player of the Year, WBCA Player of the Year, and Mercedes Benz National Player of the Year
 Two-time Kodak All-American and Naismith All-American, U.S. Basketball Writers Association All-American at the University of Texas (1987, 1989) ... consensus All-American
 Earned Most Outstanding Player honors as a freshman at the 1986 Final Four, leading Texas to the NCAA Championship and an undefeated season with a 34–0 record... Also led Texas to the NCAA Final Four (1987) and to the Elite Eight twice (1988, 1989)
 Named to both the NCAA and the Southwest Conference "Team of the Decade" for the 1980s, earning top honors as the SWC's "Athlete of the Decade"
 Scored 2,008 points during her collegiate career for an average of 19.9 ppg ... in the Texas career record book, she stands: 1st, scoring average; 3rd, scoring; 4th, rebound average (8.7 rpg); 5th, field goal pct. (.539); 8th, rebounding (887)
 Set Texas single season records (as a senior) for points (843), scoring average (26.3 ppg) and free throws made (188)
 Came to UT after starring at John Jay High School in San Antonio
 No. 24 retired by Texas Longhorns in 2020.

Texas statistics
Source

USA Basketball
Davis-Wrightsil's first experience with international basketball came in 1986, when she was a member of the team that won a gold medal at the 1986 World Championship.  She also played in the 1986 and 1994 Goodwill Games, and the 1987 Pan American Games.  After serving as an alternate on the 1988 U.S. Olympic Team, she played on the 1992 U.S. Olympic Team, which received a bronze medal in Barcelona, and was the team's second-leading scorer (13.0 ppg).

WNBA career
Clarissa Davis was selected by the Phoenix Mercury in the second round (22nd pick overall) of the 1999 WNBA Draft.  She played in fourteen games with the Mercury, averaging 9.3 points per game in her only season in the league.

Coaching career
After her playing career, Davis-Wrightsil worked for the San Antonio Spurs organization from 1999 to 2002.  She ran the Spurs' successful campaign to obtain the San Antonio Silver Stars as a WNBA franchise, and served as the Silver Star's Chief Operating Officer from 2002 to 2006.  Davis was an assistant coach for the University of Texas Longhorns women's basketball team during the 2006–2007 season.  She left Texas after one season to take a similar position with C. Vivian Stringer's Rutgers University team in 2008. After helping the Scarlet Knights to their fifth consecutive Sweet Sixteen appearance in the 2008–2009 season, Davis-Wrightsil resigned to be with her ailing mother in Texas.  Inducted into Women's Basketball Hall of Fame in April 2006, Davis is also the founder of TEAMXPRESS, a non-profit sports-based mentoring organization for girls in San Antonio, TX.

References

Further reading
 

1967 births
Living people
All-American college women's basketball players
American expatriate basketball people in Italy
American expatriate basketball people in Japan
American expatriate basketball people in Turkey
American women's basketball coaches
American women's basketball players
Basketball players at the 1987 Pan American Games
Basketball players at the 1992 Summer Olympics
Fenerbahçe women's basketball players
Galatasaray S.K. (women's basketball) players
Long Beach Stingrays players
Medalists at the 1992 Summer Olympics
New England Blizzard players
Olympic bronze medalists for the United States in basketball
Pan American Games gold medalists for the United States
Pan American Games medalists in basketball
Phoenix Mercury draft picks
Phoenix Mercury players
San Jose Lasers players
Competitors at the 1986 Goodwill Games
Competitors at the 1994 Goodwill Games
Medalists at the 1987 Pan American Games
21st-century American women
United States women's national basketball team players